The 1894–95 season was Newton Heath's third season in the Football League and their first outside the top flight. They finished third in the Second Division, earning the right to play in a Test match against Stoke City in order to regain their top-flight status. They lost the match, which was played at Vale Park, Burslem, 3–0 and remained in the Second Division. In the FA Cup, the Heathens were knocked out in the First Round after losing 3–2 to Stoke City.

A league match against Walsall Town Swifts was played on 9 March, with Newton Heath winning 14–0. However, Walsall had complained about the state of the pitch before the game, and an extra layer of sand was added prior to kick-off. Walsall's protest was upheld by The Football League, the result was nullified and the match was replayed on 9 April; Newton Heath won the replay 9–0.

The club also entered teams in the Lancashire and Manchester Senior Cups in 1894–95, but were knocked out in the first round of both competitions. As in the previous season, a Newton Heath team also competed in the Lancashire Palatine League, along with Bury and Liverpool. They beat Liverpool at home, but drew at Anfield and lost both matches against Bury. It was to be Newton Heath's last entry in the Palatine League.

Football League Second Division

Test match

FA Cup

References

Manchester United F.C. seasons
Newton Heath